Are You in Love? is the fifth studio album by Canadian folk musician Basia Bulat. It was released on March 27, 2020 under Secret City Records.

Critical reception

Are You in Love was met with generally favourable reviews from critics. At Metacritic, which assigns a weighted average rating out of 100 to reviews from mainstream publications, this release received an average score of 79, based on 9 reviews.

The album received a Juno Award nomination for Adult Alternative Album of the Year at the Juno Awards of 2021.

Track listing

Personnel
Credits adapted from Tidal.
 Basia Bulat – vocals
 Meghan Ann Uremovich – vocals
 Kevin Ratterman – engineering, mixing
 Jim James – producer
 Kris Knight- Album Art

References

2020 albums
Basia Bulat albums
Secret City Records albums
Albums produced by Jim James